John Lewis Cooper (1908–1961) was a Liberian businessman and government official who was responsible for the telecommunications developments in Liberia during the presidency of William Tubman.  He was married to Eugenia Simpson. They had four  children, three natural born and one adopted. John Lewis Jr, Julius Everett Sr., Ora and Elenora.

Early life
John Lewis Cooper was born in Monrovia, Liberia to Reverend Randolph Cassius Cooper I and Sarah Ellen Cooper, née Morris.

Education
John Lewis Cooper studied at the College of West Africa and Liberia College.

Career and government service
John Lewis was instrumental in the establishment of radio and electricity throughout rural Liberia. He held the cabinet portfolio for telecommunications in Liberia and was decorated for his service to his country.

Death
John Lewis Cooper died in 1961 in Monrovia.

Trivia
John Lewis Cooper was popularly known as 'Radio Cooper.'
John Lewis Cooper is the paternal grandfather of journalist, Helene Cooper.

References
https://www.findagrave.com/memorial/146554371/john-lewis-cooper
https://liberia77.com/explore/radio-cooper-2/?tag=editors-pick

Liberian people
Liberian businesspeople
Americo-Liberian people
People of Americo-Liberian descent
1908 births
1961 deaths
Cooper family (Liberia)